{{Speciesbox
|display_parents=3
|taxon=Megasurcula remondii
|image= 
|image_caption= |authority= (W.M. Gabb, 1866)
| synonyms_ref = 
| synonyms =
 Metula remondii Gabb 1866
 Surculites (Megasurcula) remondii (Gabb 1866)
}}Megasurcula remondii is a species of sea snail, a marine gastropod mollusk in the family Pseudomelatomidae, the turrids and allies.

Description
The length of the shell attains 78.3 mm.

Distribution
This marine species occurs off California.

References

 U. S. Grant and H. R. Gale. 1931. Catalogue of the Marine Pliocene and Pleistocene Mollusca of California''. Memoirs of the San Diego Society of Natural History 1:1-1036

External links
 Gastropods.com: Mangelia remondii

remondii
Gastropods described in 1866